Redhill station may refer to:

Redhill railway station, Redhill, Surrey, England
Redhill MRT station in Singapore

See also 
Redhill (disambiguation)